Tisona is a monotypic genus of butterflies in the family Nymphalidae that contains the species Tisona saladillensis found in South America.

Subspecies
T. s. clarior Higgins, 1981 (Bolivia)
T. s. saladillensis (Argentina)

References

	

Melitaeini
Monotypic butterfly genera
Taxa named by Robert P. Higgins